Magic from the Musicals is an album, first released in 1991, featuring a number of artists performing songs from a variety of musicals.

The performers, Brian Blessed, Petula Clark, Paul Jones, Howard Keel, Topol and Marti Webb, are all seasoned recording artists and musical theatre performers, but perform songs not necessarily previously associated with themselves.

The album was released on CD and cassette by Music Club, part of the Music Collection International group. It featured liner notes by John Martland.

Track listing 
 "Only You" from Starlight Express – Brian Blessed
 "Good Morning Starshine" from Hair – Petula Clark
 "If I Were A Rich Man" from Fiddler on the Roof – Topol
 "Luck Be a Lady" from Guys and Dolls – Paul Jones
 "Memory" from Cats – Petula Clark
 "Send in the Clowns" from A Little Night Music – Marti Webb
 "Impossible Dream" from Man of La Mancha – Brian Blessed
 "Bless Your Beautiful Hide" from Seven Brides for Seven Brothers – Howard Keel
 "Thank Heaven for Little Girls" from Gigi – Topol
 "Lullaby of Broadway" from 42nd Street – Paul Jones
 "If He Walked Into My Life" from Mame – Marti Webb
 Annie Get Your Gun Medley: "The Girl That I Marry"/"They Say It's Wonderful"/"My Defences Are Down" – Howard Keel
 "I Don't Know How to Love Him" from Jesus Christ Superstar – Marti Webb
 "I've Grown Accustomed to Her Face" from My Fair Lady – Paul Jones

References

1991 compilation albums